Oxossia is a genus of flowering plants in the subfamily Turneroideae (Passifloraceae) consisting of 15 species. This genus was recently defined in 2019 after a phylogenetic analysis of Turnera justified the creation of the genus. The genus is characterized by its stipules, small flowers, congested inflorescences, "hairy" stamen and style, and the attachment of stamen to the floral tube. All members of the genus are heterostylous with the exception of O. dasystyla. The genus can be divided into two morphological groups: those with white petals and those with yellow pink or red petals.

Species 

Oxossia albicans  (Urb.) L.Rocha
Oxossia annularis  (Urb.) L.Rocha
Oxossia calyptrocarpa  (Urb.) L.Rocha
Oxossia capitata  (Cambess.) L.Rocha
Oxossia dasystyla  (Urb.) L.Rocha
Oxossia hatschbachii  (Arbo) L.Rocha
Oxossia hebepetala  (Urb.) L.Rocha
Oxossia maracasana  (Arbo) L.Rocha
Oxossia marmorata  (Urb.) L.Rocha
Oxossia pernambucensis  (Urb.) L.Rocha
Oxossia princeps  (Arbo) L.Rocha
Oxossia rubrobracteata  (Arbo) L.Rocha
Oxossia schomburgkiana  (Urb.) L.Rocha
Oxossia spicata  (L.Rocha & Arbo) L.Rocha
Oxossia waltherioides  (Urb.) L.Rocha

Phylogeny

References 

Passifloraceae
Malpighiales genera